Stephanie Calman is the author  of six books, Confessions of a Bad Mother, Confessions of a Failed Grown-Up, How (Not) to Murder Your Mother, How (Not) to Murder Your Husband, Dressing for Breakfast and Gentleman Prefer My Sister.

In addition to being an author she created the Channel 4 sitcom Dressing for Breakfast and has appeared on TV shows such as Have I Got News for You and The Wright Stuff.

The daughter of the cartoonist Mel Calman, she is married with two children.

References

External links
 Biography Stephanie Calman

British writers
Living people
Year of birth missing (living people)